The Rainerhorn is a mountain in the Venediger Group.

References 
Willi End: Alpenvereinsführer Venedigergruppe, Munich 2006, 
Eduard Richter, Hrsg.: Erschließung der Ostalpen, III. Band, Verlag des Deutschen und Oesterreichischen Alpenvereins, Berlin 1894
Alpenvereinskarte 1:25.000, Sheet 36, Venedigergruppe

Mountains of the Alps
Venediger Group
Mountains of Tyrol (state)